Patrick Lipton Robinson (born 29 January 1944 in Jamaica) is a Jamaican member of the International Court of Justice for the term commencing February 2015. Prior to this he was formerly the President of the International Criminal Tribunal for the Former Yugoslavia, a position he held between 2008 and 2011 during which time his Chef de Cabinet was Gabrielle Louise McIntyre. He was first elected to the Tribunal in 1998 and has been re-elected twice since. In 2004, he presided over the trial of Slobodan Milošević, the former Yugoslav president.

He was educated at Jamaica College, University of the West Indies (BA, 1964), the University of London (LLB, 1968) and King's College London (LLM, 1972). He is the recipient of the national award, Order of Jamaica, awarded by the government of Jamaica for services to International Law and Honorary Doctorate Degrees from the University of the West Indies, Jamaica, and the Christian Theological Seminary in Indianapolis. He is the recipient of the award of Honorary Membership of the American Society of International Law for 2011.

He is the author of the book Jamaican Athletics – A Model for 2012 and the World.

He is a member of the Crimes Against Humanity Initiative Advisory Council, a project of the Whitney R. Harris World Law Institute at Washington University School of Law in St. Louis to establish the world's first treaty on the prevention and punishment of crimes against humanity.

Other positions held
1986: Chairman, United Nations Commission on Transnational Corporations
1988–1995: Commissioner, Inter-American Commission on Human Rights
1991–1996: Member, International Law Commission
Since 1996: Member, International Bioethics Committee
1995–1996: Foreign member, Haiti Truth and Justice Commission
1998–2015: Judge, International Criminal Tribunal for the Former Yugoslavia
2008–2011: President, International Criminal Tribunal for the Former Yugoslavia
Since 2015: Judge, International Court of Justice

References

External links
Biography - ICTY page
 Jamaican Athletics - A Model for 2012 and the World

 Lecture by Patrick Lipton Robinson entitled Fairness and Efficiency in the Proceedings of the International Criminal Tribunal for the former Yugoslavia in the Lecture Series of the United Nations Audiovisual Library of International Law

1944 births
Living people
Alumni of University of London Worldwide
Alumni of the University of London
University of the West Indies alumni
Alumni of King's College London
Members of the Middle Temple
21st-century Jamaican judges
Presidents of the International Criminal Tribunal for the former Yugoslavia
International Law Commission officials
Members of the Order of Jamaica
Jamaican judges of United Nations courts and tribunals
International Court of Justice judges
20th-century Jamaican judges
Members of the International Law Commission